Cornedo Vicentino is a town and comune in the province of Vicenza, Veneto, Italy. It is north of SP246.

Twin towns
Cornedo Vicentino is twinned with:

  Sobradinho, Rio Grande do Sul, Brazil, since 2002

References
(Google Maps)

Cities and towns in Veneto